Live!! is the first live album by Japanese garage punk band Guitar Wolf. It was released in Japan in June 2000. The album is assembled from four different performances, including a show on 31 October 1999 at CBGB. It also includes a MiniCD featuring a remix of "Jet Virus".

Track listing
 Okami Wakusei (Planet of the Wolves)
 Jet Generation
 All Night De Buttobase
 Ryusei Noise
 Reizouko Zero
 Jack the Ripper (Link Wray)
 Wild Zero
 Rock'n'roll Etiquette
 Missile Me
 Kawasaki ZII 750 Rock'n'roll
 Summertime Blues (Eddie Cochran)
 Kasei Twist
 Too Much Junkie Business (Johnny Thunders)
 Machine Gun Guitar
 Ramen Shinya 3 Ji
 Kick Out the Jams (MC5)
 Rumble (Link Wray)

External links
 Guitar Wolf biography at Narnack Records
 Guitar Wolf - Live!! (2000, CD) on Discogs

Guitar Wolf albums
2000 live albums